Alou Kuol (born 5 July 2001) is a professional footballer who plays as a striker for VfB Stuttgart. Born in Sudan and raised in Australia by South-Sudanese parents, he represents Australia at youth level.

Early life
Alou Kuol was born in Khartoum to South Sudanese parents, and has five younger brothers and an older brother named Kuol, who he credits for forcing him to relocate for soccer when he first joined the Mariners Academy. Kuol's family fled Sudan when he was three, staying in Egypt for a year before arriving in Sydney. In 2015, Kuol moved to Shepparton, where he later worked as a kitchen hand while playing youth football.

Club career
Kuol began his senior career with Victorian side Goulburn Valley Suns, after coming through the side's youth teams. Kuol trialled with A-League clubs Melbourne Victory and Western United but was unsuccessful in signing a contract with either club, he went on to sign with Central Coast Mariners a week later and scoring two goals against Western United coming off the bench at the 80th minute to win the game the following season.

Central Coast Mariners
Kuol signed with Central Coast Mariners youth team to play in the Y-League. At the conclusion of the 2019–20 Y-League season, Kuol trialled with Portuguese club Sporting CP in their under-19 squad. On 1 March 2020, Kuol made his professional debut in an A-League clash against Western United, replacing Josh Nisbet in the 73rd minute as the Mariners lost 6–2. Days later, Kuol was awarded a scholarship with the Mariners extending to the end of the 2020–21 season. He made his starting debut for the Mariners in a draw against Newcastle Jets in July 2020, and received media attention for his colourful post-match interview.

VfB Stuttgart
On 16 April 2021, following interest from several top European teams , Kuol signed a 4-year contract with VfB Stuttgart, signing until June 2025. He scored 7 goals in his first 13 appearances for the reserves team. On 28 January, 2023, Kuol made his debut for the senior team in a 2-1 defeat to RB Leipzig

Loan to Sandhausen
On 31 January 2022, Kuol was loaned to SV Sandhausen until the end of the season.

International career
Kuol was selected in the Australian under-23 team for the 2022 AFC U-23 Asian Cup. In Australia's second game of the tournament against Iraq, Kuol scored the opening goal with a spectacular scorpion kick. The game finished in a 1-all draw.

Personal life
Kuol's younger brother, Garang, plays for  Heart of Midlothian F.C. in Edinburgh on loan from Newcastle United. Another younger brother, Teng Kuol, currently plays for Western Sydney Wanderers FC Youth, after previously playing for the Central Coast Mariners Academy and Melbourne Victory FC Youth.

Career statistics

Honours
Individual
National Premier Leagues Victoria 2 top scorer: 2018

See also
List of Central Coast Mariners FC players

References

2001 births
Living people
People from Khartoum
Australian soccer players
Association football forwards
Australia under-23 international soccer players
Goulburn Valley Suns FC players
Central Coast Mariners FC players
VfB Stuttgart players
VfB Stuttgart II players
SV Sandhausen players
National Premier Leagues players
A-League Men players
Regionalliga players
2. Bundesliga players
South Sudanese emigrants to Australia
Australian expatriate soccer players
Australian expatriate sportspeople in Germany
Expatriate footballers in Germany